Avatar is a term used in Hinduism for a material manifestation of a deity. Other common uses include:

 Avatar (computing), the graphical representation of a user, also known as profile picture

Otherwise it may refer to:

Books and print media 
 Avatar (novel by Théophile Gautier), a novel by Théophile Gautier first published in 1856
 Avatar (newspaper), a Boston underground newspaper (1967–1968), last owned by the Mel Lyman Family
 The Avatar, a novel by Poul Anderson (1978)
 Avatar Press, a comic book publisher
 Avatars (series), a trilogy of fantasy novels by Tui T. Sutherland
 The Avatar Series, a series of fantasy novels set in the Forgotten Realms
 Avatar, two novels of the Star Trek: Deep Space Nine relaunch
 Avatar, a character in God's Debris and The Religion War by Scott Adams
 Avatar (Angel novel), by John Passarella set in the fictional universe of the television series Angel
 The Avatars, a fictional race in David Gemmell's Echoes of the Great Song

Film and television

Film

 Avatar (1916 film), an Italian film directed by Carmine Gallone
 Avatar, a character in the Ralph Bakshi film Wizards (1977)
 Avatar (2004 film), a Singaporean film starring Genevieve O'Reilly
 Avatar (2009 film), a science fiction film directed by James Cameron
 Avatar (franchise), the franchise that started with the above film
 The Last Airbender, a 2010 film based on the TV series Avatar: The Last Airbender

Television 

 Avatar: The Last Airbender, a 2005 animated television series that aired on Nickelodeon
 Avatar: The Last Airbender (franchise), the franchise that started with the above series
 "Avatar" (Batman: The Animated Series), an episode of Batman: The Animated Series
 "Avatar" (Stargate SG-1), an episode of Stargate SG-1
 "Avatar" (The X-Files), an episode of The X-Files
 Avatars (Carnivàle), a fictional race of creatures in Carnivàle
 Avatars (Charmed), a fictional group of beings in Charmed
 "Avatar", an episode of the television series Highlander: The Series
 Avatar, a fictional golden sword in the television series Encantadia
 The Avatar, a character in the Ōban Star-Racers universe
 "Captain Avatar", a character in the Space Battleship Yamato (Star Blazers) universe

Games 
 Avatar (PLATO system video game), an early computer role-playing game 1979
 AVATAR (MUD), the fantasy, online role-playing game
 Avatar: The Last Airbender (video game)
 Avatar: The Last Airbender Trading Card Game
 Avatar: Legends of the Arena, a 2008 video game for Microsoft Windows by Nickelodeon
 James Cameron's Avatar: The Game, an adaptation of the 2009 film
 Avatar (Ultima), the main character in the Ultima game series
 Avatar (Xbox), a service that allows users to create graphical avatars

Music 
 Avatar (Swedish band), a Swedish melodic death metal band
 Avatar (Avatar album), the third album released by Swedish metal band Avatar
 Avatar (Angels and Agony album)
 Avatar (Comets on Fire album)
 Avatar Records, a record label
 Savatage or Avatar, an American heavy metal band
 "(Do You Wanna Date My) Avatar", a song by the cast of The Guild
 Avatar, a box set by Pete Townshend, benefitting the Avatar Meher Baba Trust
 "Avatar", a song by Dead Can Dance from Spleen and Ideal
 "Avatar", a song by Manilla Road from Mark of the Beast

Other uses 
 Avatar (horse), an American racehorse
 Avatar (spacecraft), a conceptual spaceplane planned by India's Defense Research and Development Organization as well as Indian Space Research Organization, among others
 Avatar, Iran, a village in Qazvin Province, Iran
 Avatar Technologies, Inc., a defunct American computer company based in Massachusetts
 ARP Avatar, a guitar synthesizer
 Avatar Course, a series of LGAT self-development courses
 Advanced Video Attribute Terminal Assembler and Recreator or AVATAR, a text graphics protocol used by bulletin board systems (BBSes)
 Avatar, a superuser on some Unix operating systems
 Avatar, a wrestling gimmick portrayed by American professional wrestler Al Snow
Ikrandraco avatar, a species of pterosaur
Ommatoiulus avatar, a species of millipede

See also 
 Avtaar, a 1983 Indian film starring Rajesh Khanna
 
 
 Incarnation